DNA on DNA is a compilation album by DNA, released on May 11, 2004, through No More Records.

Track listing

Personnel

DNA 
Arto Lindsay – guitar, vocals
Ikue Mori – drums
Tim Wright – bass guitar

Production and additional personnel 
Chris Flam – mastering
Jason Gross – production
Alan Schneider – production

References

External links 
 

2004 compilation albums
DNA (American band) albums